A yellow-back or yellowback is a cheap novel which was published in Britain in the second half of the 19th century. They were occasionally called "mustard-plaster" novels.

Developed in the 1840s to compete with the "penny dreadful", yellow-backs were marketed as entertaining reading. They had brightly coloured covers, often printed by chromoxylography, that were attractive to a new class of readers, thanks to the spread of education and rail travel.

Routledge was one of the first publishers to begin marketing yellow-backs by starting their "Railway Library" in 1848. The series included 1,277 titles, published over 50 years. These mainly consisted of stereotyped reprints of novels originally published as cloth editions. By the late 19th century, yellow-backs included sensational fiction, adventure stories, "educational" manuals, handbooks, and cheap biographies.

Two typical examples of authors of yellow-backs include James Grant and Robert Louis Stevenson.

See also

Airport novel
Sensation novel

References

Further reading
 Michael Sadleir, Collecting "Yellowbacks", London: Constable, 1938 (Aspects of Book-Collecting series).
 Michael Sadleir, XIX Century Fiction. A Bibliographical Record based on his own Collection, Constable & Co. and University of California Press, 1951; reprinted by Cooper Square Publishers, New York, 1969. 2 volumes. Vol. II lists Sadleir's personal "Yellow Back Collection".
 Chester W. Topp, Victorian Yellowbacks & Paperbacks, 1849-1905, Denver, Colorado: Hermitage Antiquarian Bookshop, 1993, 9 volumes, as follows: Vol. 1. George Routledge; Vol. 2. Ward & Lock; Vol. 3. Hotten, Chatto & Windus; Vol. 4. Frederick Warne & Co., Sampson Low & Co.; Vol. 5. MacMillan & Co., Smith, Elder & Co.; Vol. 6. Longmans, Green & Co.; Vol. 7. F.V. White & Co. Cassell & Co., W. Blackwood & Sons, Vizetelly & Co.; Vol. 8. Simpkin, Marshall & Co., J.W. Arrowsmith, R. Bentley, Ward & Downey, J. Blackwood; Vol. 9. David Bryce, Ingram, Cooke & Co., David Bogue, Henry Lea, Swan Sonnenschein & Co., J & C. Brown & Co.
 Robert Lee Wolff,  Yellowbacks occupy a prominent position in this catalogue.

External links 
Digital collection of Yellowback covers UCLA
Yellowbacks at Emory, Stuart A. Rose Manuscript, Archives, and Rare Book Library, Emory University - digitalized yellowbacks available for download
 Guide to the Yellowback Press collection, 1981-1995 at University of South Florida Libraries
 
 Yellowbacks: Don’t Judge These Victorian Books by Their Covers, Antheneaum of Philadelphia
 Aspects of the Victorian book: Yellowbacks, at British Library
 Now that's a novel idea at BBC
 Yellowbacks : an exhibition, at Monash University Library - also: Exhibition catalogue
 Recent acquisitions - Rare Books at National Library of Scotland

19th-century British literature
Novel forms
Literary genres
British culture
Pulp fiction